Electronic textiles or e-textiles are fabrics that enable electronic components such as batteries, lights, sensors, and microcontrollers to be embedded in them.  They are not to be confused with smart textiles, which are fabrics that have been developed with new technologies that provide added value. Many smart clothing, wearable technology, and wearable computing projects involve the use of e-textiles.

Electronic textiles are distinct from wearable computing because the emphasis is placed on the seamless integration of textiles with electronic elements like microcontrollers, sensors, and actuators. Furthermore, e-textiles need not be wearable.  For instance, e-textiles are also found in interior design.

The related field of fibretronics explores how electronic and computational functionality can be integrated into textile fibers.

A new report from Cientifica Research examines the markets for textile-based wearable technologies, the companies producing them, and the enabling technologies. The report identifies three distinct generations of textile wearable technologies:

 "First-generation" attach a sensor to apparel. This approach is currently taken by sportswear brands such as Adidas, Nike, and Under Armour
 "Second-generation" products embed the sensor in the garment, as demonstrated by current products from Samsung, Alphabet, Ralph Lauren, and Flex.
 In "third-generation" wearables, the garment is the sensor. A growing number of companies are creating pressure, strain, and temperature sensors for this purpose.

Future applications for e-textiles may be developed for sports and well-being products, and medical devices for patient monitoring. Technical textiles, fashion and entertainment will also be significant applications.

History 
The basic materials needed to construct e-textiles, conductive threads, and fabrics have been around for over 1000 years. In particular, artisans have been wrapping fine metal foils, most often gold and silver, around fabric threads for centuries. Many of Queen Elizabeth I's gowns, for example, were embroidered with gold-wrapped threads.
 
At the end of the 19th century, as people developed and grew accustomed to electric appliances, designers and engineers began to combine electricity with clothing and jewelry—developing a series of illuminated and motorized necklaces, hats, brooches and costumes. For example, in the late 1800s, a person could hire young women adorned in light-studded evening gowns from the Electric Girl Lighting Company to provide cocktail party entertainment.
  
In 1968, the Museum of Contemporary Craft in New York City held a ground-breaking exhibition called Body Covering that focused on the relationship between technology and apparel. The show featured astronauts' space suits along with clothing that could inflate and deflate, light up, and heat and cool itself. Particularly noteworthy in this collection was the work of Diana Dew, a designer who created a line of electronic fashion, including electroluminescent party dresses and belts that could sound alarm sirens.

In 1985, inventor Harry Wainwright created the first fully animated sweatshirt. The shirt consisted of fiber optics, leads, and a microprocessor to control individual frames of animation. The result was a full-color cartoon displayed on the surface of the shirt. in 1995, Wainwright went on to invent the first machine enabling fiber optics to be machined into fabrics, the process needed for manufacturing enough for mass markets and, in 1997, hired a German machine designer, Herbert Selbach, from Selbach Machinery to produce the world's first computer numerical control (CNC) machine able to automatically implant fiber optics into any flexible material.  Receiving the first of a dozen patents based on LED/Optic displays and machinery in 1989, the first CNC machines went into production in 1998 beginning with the production of animated coats for Disney Parks in 1998. The first ECG bio-physical display jackets employing LED/optic displays were created by Wainwright and David Bychkov, the CEO of Exmovere at the time in 2005 using GSR sensors in a watch connected via Bluetooth to the embedded machine washable display in a denim jacket and were demonstrated at the Smart Fabrics Conference held in Washington, D.C. May 7, 2007. Additional smart fabric technologies were unveiled by Wainwright at two Flextech Flexible Display conferences held in Phoenix, AZ, showing infrared digital displays machine-embedded into fabrics for IFF (Identification of Friend or Foe) which were submitted to BAE Systems for evaluation in 2006 and won an "Honorable Mention" award from NASA in 2010 on their Tech Briefs, "Design the Future" contest. MIT personnel purchased several fully animated coats for their researchers to wear at their demonstrations in 1999 to bring attention to their "Wearable Computer" research. Wainwright was commissioned to speak at the Textile and Colorists Conference in Melbourne, Australia on June 5, 2012. He was requested to demonstrate his fabric creations that change color using any smartphone, indicate callers on mobile phones without a digital display, and contain WIFI security features that protect purses and personal items from theft.

In the mid-1990s a team of MIT researchers led by Steve Mann, Thad Starner, and Sandy Pentland began to develop what they termed wearable computers. These devices consisted of traditional computer hardware attached to and carried on the body. In response to technical, social, and design challenges faced by these researchers, another group at MIT, which included Maggie Orth and Rehmi Post, began to explore how such devices might be more gracefully integrated into clothing and other soft substrates. Among other developments, this team explored integrating digital electronics with conductive fabrics and developed a method for embroidering electronic circuits. One of the first commercially available wearable Arduino based microcontrollers, called the Lilypad Arduino, was also created at the MIT Media Lab by Leah Buechley.

Fashion houses like CuteCircuit are utilizing e-textiles for their haute couture collections and special projects. CuteCircuit's Hug Shirt allows the user to send electronic hugs through sensors within the garment.

Overview 
The field of e-textiles can be divided into two main categories:
 E-textiles with classical electronic devices such as conductors, integrated circuits, LEDs, OLEDs and conventional batteries embedded into garments.
 E-textiles with electronics integrated directly into the textile substrates. This can include either passive electronics such as conductors and resistors or active components like transistors, diodes, and solar cells.

E-textiles are mainly conductive yarn, textile and fabric while the other half of the suppliers and manufacturers use conductive polymers such as polyacetylene and poly-phenylene vinylene). 

Most research and commercial e-textile projects are hybrids where electronic components embedded in the textile are connected to classical electronic devices or components. Some examples are touch buttons that are constructed completely in textile forms by using conducting textile weaves, which are then connected to devices such as music players or LEDs that are mounted on woven conducting fiber networks to form displays.

Printed sensors for both physiological and environmental monitoring have been integrated into textiles including cotton, Gore-Tex, and neoprene.

Sensors 
Smart textile fabric can be made from materials ranging from traditional cotton, polyester, and nylon, to advanced Kevlar with integrated functionalities. At present, however, fabrics with electrical conductivity are of interest. Electrically conductive fabrics have been produced by deposition of metal nanoparticles around the woven fibers and fabrics. The resulting metallic fabrics are conductive, hydrophilic and have high electroactive surface areas. These properties render them ideal substrates for electrochemical biosensing, which has been demonstrated with the detection of DNA and proteins.

There are two kinds of smart textile (fabric) products that have been developed and studied for health monitoring: Fabric with textile-based sensor electronics and fabric that envelopes traditional sensor electronics. It has shown that weaving can be used to incorporate electrically conductive yarn into a fabric to obtain a textile that can be used as a "Wearable Motherboard". It can connect multiple sensors on the body, such as wet gel ECG electrodes, to the signal acquisition electronics. Later research has shown that conductive yarns can be instrumental in the fabrication of textile-based sensors made of fabric or metallic meshes coated with silver or conductive metal cores woven into the fabric.

There are two broad approaches to the fabrication of garments with ECG sensor electrodes in research:
 Finished garments through functionalization or integration of finished garments with sensor elements. This approach involves the integration of finished electrodes into finished garments by simply stitching the electrodes at the appropriate locations on the garment or using deposition techniques to transfer the functional materials at the appropriate locations.
 Unfinished garments. The introduction of smart materials during the garment fabrication process. This in Finished approach entails the use of textile fabrication techniques to form woven or nonwoven fabrics with the inclusion of functional materials.

Fibretronics 
Just as in classical electronics, the construction of electronic capabilities on textile fibers requires the use of conducting and semi-conducting materials such as a conductive textile.  There are a number of commercial fibers today that include metallic fibers mixed with textile fibers to form conducting fibers that can be woven or sewn. However, because both metals and classical semiconductors are stiff material, they are not very suitable for textile fiber applications, since fibers are subjected to much stretch and bending during use.

Smart wearables are consumer-grade connected electronic devices that may be embedded into clothing. 

One of the most important issues of e-textiles is that the fibers should be washable. Electrical components would thus need to be insulated during washing to prevent damage.

A new class of electronic materials that are more suitable for e-textiles is the class of organic electronics materials, because they can be conducting, as well as semiconducting, and designed as inks and plastics.

Some of the most advanced functions that have been demonstrated in the lab include:
 Organic fiber transistors: the first textile fiber transistor that is completely compatible with textile manufacturing and that contains no metals at all.
 Organic solar cells on fibers

Uses 
 Health monitoring of vital signs such as heart rate, respiration rate, temperature, activity, and posture.
 Sports training data acquisition
 Monitoring personnel handling hazardous materials
 Tracking the position and status of soldiers in action
 Military app – Soldier's bulletproof kevlar vest; if the wearer is shot, the material can sense the bullet's impact and send a radio message back to base
 Monitoring pilot or truck driver fatigue
 Diagnosing amputee discomfort
 Innovative fashion (wearable tech)
 Regain sensory perception that was previously lost by accident or birth

See also
Activity tracker
Clothing technology
Computer-mediated reality
Cyborg
eHealth
Hexoskin
Futuristic clothing
Heart rate monitor
Identity tag
Wearable technology
Wearable computer

References

Technical fabrics
Ambient intelligence
Emerging technologies
Medical equipment
First aid
Military medicine
Textile industry
Clothing industry